Trigonopterus asper is a species of flightless weevil in the genus Trigonopterus from Indonesia.

Etymology
The specific name is derived from Latin asper, meaning "coarse" or "rough".  This refers to the uneven texture of its integument.

Description
Individuals measure 2.48–2.60 mm in length.  General coloration is black with rust-colored legs and head.

Range

Phylogeny
T. asper is in the T. dimorphus species group, and is closely related to T. variolosus.  It can be distinguished from the latter by its larger penis.

References

asper
Beetles described in 2014
Beetles of Asia